Joshua R. Pahigian (born January 22, 1974) is an American author who specializes in books and articles about baseball.  He is particularly well known as an expert in the field of sports travel, writing books on this topic as well as articles that have appeared in espn.com. Most popular among Pahigian's books are: The Ultimate Baseball Road-trip and 101 Baseball Places to See Before You Strike Out.

In 2015, Pahigian received a legislative commendation from the Commonwealth of Massachusetts House of Representatives for "his commitment to preserving the history of America's favorite pastime." His travels and the books that chronicle them have also been featured in USA Today and other national publications.

Pahigian has also written short stories that have been published in American literary journals such as Passages North, the Hawaii Review, and Ararat, and has been translated in several Armenian language periodicals and anthologies.  He is known to Armenian readers for the juxtaposition that his work is said to present between modern American values and enduring Armenian cultural tradition.

Pahigian's first novel, Strangers on the Beach was published in October 2012 by Maine-based Islandport Press. The mystery, set in Old Orchard Beach, Maine, crosses the story-line of a billionaire adventurer, who arrives in Old Orchard Beach under unusual circumstances one summer, with the stories of several townies. The book was named a 2012 Indie Sleeper Pick by Publishers Weekly, and a Best Books of 2012 selection by the Maine Edge.

Pahigian is a Mentor in the Western Connecticut State University Low Residency Master of Fine Arts program in Creative and Professional Writing, and a Fellow in the University of New England Center for Global Humanities in Biddeford, Maine.

Books

References

External links 
Josh Pahigian articles on ESPN.com
Josh Pahigian books on amazon.com

Living people
American sportswriters
American short story writers
American writers of Armenian descent
University of New England (United States) faculty
1974 births